Antoon Stillemans (10 December 1832, Sint-Niklaas – 5 November 1916, Ghent) was for 26 years the twenty-fourth bishop of Ghent, in Belgium.

Education 
Stillemans began studies at the St. Joseph Minor Seminary of Sint-Niklaas in 1846. In 1853 he enrolled at the major seminary in Ghent, earning a doctoral degree in philosophy at the University of Leuven in 1860. Stillemans' brother, also became a priest.

Career 
He was named in 1867 Superior of the St. Joseph Minor Seminary of Sint-Niklaas, for a period of 21 years. He became president of the Major seminary in 1888 and canon of the cathedral chapter of Ghent and member of the episcopal council. He was canon elect after the sudden death of Henri-Charles Lambrecht. He promoted the Gothic Revival, and had the current Episcopal Palace in Ghent restyled as well building a new major seminary in Ghent.

He named his brother Pierre-Louis Stillemans an honorary canon of St-Bavo.

In 1899, under pressure of the royal court and Minister Woeste, he suspended Adolf Daens, a radical priest in Aalst. He promoted the social cultural movement of Flanders. In 1902 he consecrated the new church attached to Dendermonde Abbey. In 1906, he celebrated his golden jubilee of priest and in 1914, his silver jubilee as bishop of Ghent. He was honored with the sacred pallium with papal permission at the end of his career. A street was named in his honor in Sint-Niklaas, as well a stained-glass window inside the town hall, he gifted Sint-Niklaas with a large copy of his portrait. The colors of the city, blue and yellow are reflected in his heraldic episcopal crest.

After his death he left his crosier to the main church of Sint-Niklaas where he was baptized. He was succeeded by Mgr. Emilius Seghers.

Honours 
 7 October 1889: Honorary Doctorate from the Catholic University of Leuven.
 1895: Officer in the Order of Leopold.
 14 November 1901: Papal Domestic Prelate, and assistant of the pontifical throne.
 30 November 1911: pallium by pontifical dispensation.

References

External links
catholic-hierarchy.org
lukasweb.be

Bishops of Ghent
19th-century Roman Catholic bishops in Belgium
20th-century Roman Catholic bishops in Belgium
Canons (priests)
1832 births
1916 deaths
People from Sint-Niklaas